Arthur F. Ryan is an American businessman that came to prominence during the 1990s, when he was the first outsider to become CEO of Prudential Insurance.

Starter years
Arthur Ryan was born in Brooklyn, New York and raised on Long Island. He attended Bishop Loughlin Memorial High School. He went on to attend Providence College in 1963, where he received his BA in mathematics. During college, Ryan sold magazines to earn extra money; this was Ryan's first sales experience job.  Ryan also served in the U.S. Army and was stationed outside of Washington D.C. While being in D.C., Ryan decided to take extra classes at American University. In 1965, Ryan was discharged from the Army and went to work as a computer system designer at Control Data Corporation.

Early career
From 1972 to December 1994, Ryan worked with Chase Manhattan Bank. In 1976, Ryan became head of the entire securities processing business for Chase. In 1978, Ryan hit his big break when Thomas G. Labrecque saw potential in Ryan and gave him the responsibility to oversee the bank's domestic wholesale operations like check processing, wire transfers and securities services. By 1984, Ryan was appointed to an executive vice president for Chase and received a chairman position on the board. In the same year, Labrecque succeeded the former CEO and Ryan realized that his career at Chase hit a plateau.

Prudential Insurance
At 52 years in old, Ryan was offered CEO and chairman position at Prudential Insurance, a life insurance company. He was the first outsider to become CEO of the company. He changed the whole system that Prudential operated on and the environment the Prudential grew a reputation for. In the news, Prudential was covered with scandals, so he asked New Jersey to launch a full investigation against the company. New Jersey came up with $35 million in fines and $410 million to $1 billion for victimized policy holders. During this time, Prudential slowly slipped down to 5th in assets. Ryan had no political agenda, he was there solely to create a better company. Ryan also launched an $800 million cost-cutting program. He fired hundreds of agents and managers. He improved the technology keeping Prudential competitive. Ryan's greatest success was bringing the company from a mutual to a stock company (a private company to public). The new company, Prudential Financial, took control of Prudential Insurance's assets while Ryan remained CEO.

He retired from Prudential in 2008 and now lives in Florida but remains on the Board of biopharmaceutical company Regeneron Pharmaceuticals.

Philanthropy
  Arthur Ryan has been a loyal and generous supporter of his alma mater, Providence College, from which he earned a mathematics degree in 1963. In January 2015, the college announced that the new home of its School of Business will be called The Arthur and Patricia Ryan Center for Business Studies, thanks to a generous naming gift. The Ryan Concert Hall in the college's Smith Center for the Arts already bears the Ryan name, and the Arthur F. Ryan Family Scholarship Fund supports PC business students from Suffolk County, where he grew up. Ryan has also donated back to his high school. He and his wife have always valued the educational system and support it. He is also involved with New Jersey United to help public schools stay on top of the standards and better the community.

Ryan is a trustee of Prudential Foundation and the Board of NewYork–Presbyterian Hospital.

Ryan is married to his wife Patricia and has four grown children. He retired from Prudential in 2008 and now lives in Florida. He is the grandfather of seven.

References 

Living people
Prudential Financial people
Bishop Loughlin Memorial High School alumni
American chief executives of financial services companies
Providence College alumni
People from Long Island
Year of birth missing (living people)